UAP may refer to:

 Unidentified Aerial Phenomenon

People
 Unlicensed assistive personnel

Places
 Yap Island

Facilities and structures
 Tour UAP, an office skyscraper in La Défense, Paris

Computing
 Uniform access principle
 User Account Protection in Microsoft Windows Vista
 User Agent Profiling

Education
 , Argentina
 Universidad Alas Peruanas, Peru
 University of Agriculture, Peshawar, Pakistan
 University of Alabama Press
 University of Asia and the Pacific, Philippines
 University of Asia Pacific, Bangladesh

Organizations
 United American Patriots
 United Architects of the Philippines
 Urban Art Projects, Australian art fabricator
 United Australia Party
 United Australia Party (2013)

See also